Judenstein (Meaning "Jew stone") is a district of the village Rinn, Austria. In 1671, the blood libel cult of Anderl von Rinn emerged, and a church was built around a rock where a child (Anderl, "Little Andrew") allegedly had been murdered by Jews in a ritual murder, thus the name of the place.

There is a large stone within the nave of the church which had probably been brought in from elsewhere as there are no other large freestanding stones in the immediate neighbourhood, although there were back when the church was built. The church is lavishly decorated with paintings and mouldings in Rococo style that is said to have been carried out in 1730/40. The same style of elaborate decoration can be seen in a number of churches in the area, for example nearby Rinn, which is even more elaborate, and notably in Innsbruck.

Nearby municipalities 
 Gasteig, Mooshöfe, Rinn and Mount Rinn (918), Tulfes
 (To west) Aldrans (old Rans), Ampass, Ellbögen, Rans, Sistrans (south Rans), Lans(To north-west) Absam, Hall, Mils, Rum, Innsbruck

References

Cities and towns in Innsbruck-Land District
Blood libel
Antisemitism in Austria